The British UFO Research Association or BUFORA is a UK organisation formerly registered as "BUFORA Ltd"; dedicated to investigating UFO phenomena in the British Isles. In 1997 the organisation was reported to have around 1,000 members.

History
In 1991, the book UFO Encyclopedia was compiled for the group by Major Sir Patrick Wall.

Status
BUFORA investigates over 400 cases a year, with the organisation reporting 95% of them as hoaxes. They run witness support groups for those who believe they have encountered extra terrestrials. The organisation has held an annual conference at Sheffield Hallam University since 1987 and hold meetings across the country; with Rendlesham Forest being a frequent spot for gatherings. They have been outspoken critics of the UK government's Freedom of Information Act as it relates to UFOs.

Controversy
An entry in the UFO Encyclopedia, which was a sighting confirmed as genuine by BUFORA, was later found to be a hoax. The supposed contactee, who claimed to have seen a UFO hovering over the town of Warminster, admitted to the hoax in 1994. In 1995, the group were the only official UFO organisation to endorse a film, purportedly by the US government, showing an alien autopsy at Roswell.

See also
List of UFO organizations

References

UFO organizations
Forteana
Paranormal investigators
1962 establishments in the United Kingdom
Organizations established in 1962